Kenneth Nysæther (born 17 February 1970) is a Norwegian footballer who played as both a defender and striker.

Career
Active in both Norway and the Netherlands between 1989 and 2001, Nysæther made over 200 career appearances at high levels, scoring over 50 goals. Born in Drammen, Nysæther played club football for Lillestrøm, Vålerenga, Strømsgodset, Fortuna Sittard, HamKam and Skjetten/Romerike.

He then continued his career at a lower level. He played for Skjetten now and then, before returning to the Lillestrøm system as a youth coach. Ahead of the 2008 season he left to become playing assistant coach in Aurskog-Finstadbru. In 2009, he joined local rivals Høland. After only one season he returned to Skjetten, this time as playing head coach.

He earned one cap for the Norwegian under-21 team in 1990.

References

External links
 Altomfotball.no

1970 births
Living people
Norwegian footballers
Norway under-21 international footballers
Norwegian expatriate footballers
Norwegian expatriate sportspeople in the Netherlands
Expatriate footballers in the Netherlands
Lillestrøm SK players
Vålerenga Fotball players
Strømsgodset Toppfotball players
Fortuna Sittard players
Hamarkameratene players
Skjetten SK players
Eliteserien players
Norwegian football managers
Sportspeople from Drammen
Association football defenders
Association football forwards